Qandi Bolagh (also Romanized as Qandī Bolāgh; also known as Kand Bulag, Kandbulāq, and Qand Bolāgh) is a village in Ijrud-e Pain Rural District, Halab District, Ijrud County, Zanjan Province, Iran. At the 2006 census, its population was 72, in 15 families.

References 

Populated places in Ijrud County